SS Republic may refer to the following ships:

 , lost in an 1865 hurricane with a cargo of mostly silver coins
 , a liner of the White Star Line
 , a palatial White Star Line steamship that sank after colliding with SS Florida
 , originally the German ship SS Servian (1903), seized 1917 by U.S., in commercial and military use at different times, variously named President Grant, President Buchanan, and Republic, scrapped 1952
 SS Republic (1920), tanker built at Bethlehem Shipbuilding Corp, Wilmington, sank on February 22, 1942 hit by two torpedoes from German submarine U-504. Owned by American Republics Corporation
SS Republic (1944), tanker, was El Caney, built in 1944 at Alabama Dry Dock, operated by American Republics Corporation.

Ship names